Les Visiteurs is a French fantasy comedy film directed by Jean-Marie Poiré and released in 1993. In this comedy, a 12th-century knight and his squire travel in time to the end of the 20th century and find themselves adrift in modern society.

Les Visiteurs was the highest-grossing film in France in 1993 and remains the fourteenth highest grossing film in the country today. The publicity for the film used the tagline Ils ne sont pas nés d'hier ("They weren't born yesterday"). Reno and Clavier reprised their roles in a sequel in 1998, the American remake Just Visiting in 2001 and a second sequel in 2016. The Castle of Ermenonville, in Oise département, served as decoration for the castle of Montmirail in the current time and the Cité de Carcassonne for medieval period.

Plot 
In the year 1123, Godefroy Amaury de Malfête, Count of Apremont and Papincourt, saves the life of his beloved sovereign, King Louis VI "Le Gros" ("The Fat") from the sword of a "horribilis" Englishman.

For this action of bravery, the King makes him Count of Montmirail and promises him the woman he loves, the beautiful Frénégonde de Pouille. On his way to the castle to marry Frénégonde, Godefroy takes a witch prisoner, and she drugs his drinking flask. Hallucinating, he believes the Duke of Pouille, father of his future wife, is a ferocious bear, and kills him with a crossbow bolt. During the Duke's funeral, Frénégonde refuses to marry Godefroy because of the tragedy; meanwhile, Godefroy's servant, the disreputable Jacquouille la Fripouille, steals the Duke's jewels at end of the funeral.

In an attempt to repair his mistake, Godefroy asks the wizard Eusebius to send him back in time to a moment before he shot the Duke. The old wizard muddles his magical spell, accidentally sending Godefroy and Jacquouille to the year 1992. There, they immediately run into trouble. Godefroy attacks a postman driving his car, mistaking him for a Moor in a devil's chariot; when he meets his descendant, Béatrice de Montmirail, an aristocrat who looks exactly like Frénégonde, she calls the Gendarmerie, who first imprison him, then as Béatrice thinks Godefroy is her distant cousin suffering from amnesia, take him to a mental hospital. Jacquouille, meanwhile, is befriended by Ginette la Clocharde ("Ginette the Tramp" in French), an attractive vagrant they meet early in their adventure.

Béatrice, thinking Godefroy to be her long-lost stuntman cousin Hubert, gets Godefroy out of the mental hospital and takes them back to her home, much to her husband (who greatly dislikes the fact of the two being in their home) Jean-Pierre's dismay. There, various culture-shock comedy ensues as Godefroy and Jacquouille attempt to fathom modern household appliances, such as flooding the bathroom by leaving the tap open, using an umbrella as a pike to roast a  leg of lamb and setting it on fire, washing their hands in the toilet, trashing the bathroom during their baths and wasting all of the family's 6,000 FF Chanel No. 5, greatly angering Jean-Pierre.

Seeing the family seal on Godefroy's hand, Beatrice assumes he stole the jewel from the castle de Montmirail, now renovated into an expensive hotel. They go there and meet the owner of the castle, the effete Jacques-Henri Jacquard, the unwitting descendant and close likeness of Jacquouille (they react to each other with mutual disgust). The jewel on Godefroy's hand starts to burn as they get closer to the castle, where the present-day version of the seal is. The two seals explode and destroy Jacquard's brand new Range Rover.

Godefroy books a room for the night and reopens a secret passage known only to him. There he finds a letter telling him to go to a certain address, where an aged Monsieur Ferdinand, the last descendant of the wizard Eusebius, gives him the potion that will return him to the year 1123. Jacquouille, however, wants to stay, enjoying Ginette's company and having proved more adaptable than Godefroy in discovering toothpaste, modern clothing and other amenities of the future. Furious at his behavior, Godefroy finally brings him to the hotel room by force.

While Godefroy is talking with Béatrice, Jacquouille swaps jackets with his descendant, closes the curtains, dims the lights, drugs Jacquard and puts him on the bed in his place. In the dark, Godefroy gives Jacquard (thinking it is Jacquouille) the potion which then sends him back to the year 1123. Godefroy equally comes back just in time to stop himself from shooting Frénégonde's father, and the deflected crossbow bolt kills the witch who caused the whole misadventure by drugging Godefroy's flask. The bewildered Jacquard finds himself stranded in the past in the role of Godefroy's servant as Godefroy leaves on horseback with Frénégonde.

Cast 
 Christian Clavier: Jacquouille la Fripouille (in English, Jacquasse la Crasse) / Jacques-Henri Jacquard
 Jean Reno: Godefroy de Montmirail, Count of Montmirail, Apremont and Papincourt
 Valérie Lemercier: Frénégonde de Pouille / Béatrice de Montmirail
 Christian Bujeau: Jean-Pierre Goulard
 Marie-Anne Chazel: Ginette la Clocharde
 Isabelle Nanty: Fabienne Morlot
 Gérard Séty: Edgar Bernay
 Didier Pain: Louis VI le Gros (the Fat)
 Jean-Paul Muel: Maréchal-des-Logis Gibon
 Arielle Séménoff: Jacqueline
 Michel Peyrelon: Édouard Bernay
 Pierre Vial: Eusebius the Wizard / Monsieur Ferdinand
 François Lalande: The priest
 Didier Bénureau: Doctor Beauvin
 Frédéric Baptiste: Freddy

Reception
Les Visiteurs opened at number one in France with a gross of 17.6 million French francs ($3.3 million) for the week and remained there for ten weeks. It returned to number one for another 7 weeks and was the highest-grossing film in France in 1993 with 13,782,846 ticket sales and a gross of $78 million. It was the highest-grossing non-English language film worldwide that year with a gross of $98.8 million. It remains one of the highest grossing French films ever.

Awards and nominations 
César Awards (France)
Won: Best Actress – Supporting Role (Valérie Lemercier)
Nominated: Best Actor – Leading Role (Christian Clavier)
Nominated: Best Actor – Leading Role (Jean Reno)
Nominated: Best Costume Design (Catherine Leterrier)
Nominated: Best Director (Jean-Marie Poiré)
Nominated: Best Editing (Catherine Kelber)
Nominated: Best Film
Nominated: Best Music (Eric Levi)
Nominated: Best Writing (Christian Clavier and Jean-Marie Poiré)

Home media
The film was released on video in France on 15 December 1993. Permission needed to be sought from the French government to release it less than a year after its theatrical release.

Sequels 
A sequel, The Visitors II: The Corridors of Time followed in 1998, and an American remake, Just Visiting, made with the same stars, was released in 2001. Another sequel, The Visitors: Bastille Day, was released in 2016.

See also 
 The Navigator: A Medieval Odyssey

References

External links 
 
 

1993 films
Films about time travel
1990s fantasy comedy films
French fantasy comedy films
Films set in France
Films set in the 12th century
Films set in 1992
Films set in the Middle Ages
Films about witchcraft
Gaumont Film Company films
Films directed by Jean-Marie Poiré
1993 comedy films
1990s French films